Henry Bell (1647–1711) was an English architect, a contemporary of Christopher Wren.

Bell was born in King’s Lynn, Norfolk and baptised in St Margaret's Church. He was the son of a wealthy merchant family and his father was twice mayor. He was admitted to Gonville and Caius College, Cambridge in 1661.

He designed many buildings in West Norfolk including the Custom House in King's Lynn and All Saints Church in North Runcton.

He served twice as Mayor of King's Lynn, he was well educated and travelled through Europe. In 1676 he met Robert Hooke, who shared with him his experiences of rebuilding London following the Great Fire. This knowledge had a bearing on his future work, as the design of North Runcton Church shows similarities with those employed by Wren, for example St Mary-at-Hill. He was responsible for the rebuilding of All Saints' Church and possibly the Sessions House, Northampton  after  a fire.

He died in 1711.

References

Further reading
"Henry Bell of King's Lynn", Architectural History, Vol. 4, (1961), pp. 41–62.
Geoffrey Webb, "Henry Bell of King's Lynn", The Burlington Magazine for Connoisseurs, Vol. 47, No. 268 (Jul., 1925), pp. 24–33
James Stevens Curl, A Dictionary of Architecture and Landscape, 2000 (entry for "Bell, Henry").

Architects from Norfolk
King's Lynn and West Norfolk
1711 deaths
1647 births
Mayors of King's Lynn
17th-century English architects
People from King's Lynn
18th-century English architects
Alumni of Gonville and Caius College, Cambridge